Vyasa Vidyalaya Matriculation Higher Secondary School is located in Balaji Nagar, Puzhuthivakkam in Chennai, India.

Founder
The school was founded by Vellathai who also became the first principal of the school in 1989. Principal Vellthai previously worked in G. K. Shetty Hindu Vidyalaya Matriculation Higher Secondary School, but left to start the Vyasa Vidhyalya school 1989.

The school is known for its cricket and football team.
It is one of the best school along with DAV and Prince matriculation.

History
The school opened on 9 June 1989.  It has achieved many state ranks. It is situated at Puzhuthivakkam.
The current principal is Mr. Sundar who is also a Lawyer by profession.

Primary schools in Tamil Nadu
High schools and secondary schools in Chennai
Educational institutions established in 1989
1989 establishments in Tamil Nadu